Peabody is a surname, and may refer to:

 Arthur Peabody (1858–1942), Campus architect for the University of Wisconsin from 1905 to 1915 and the state architect of Wisconsin from 1915 to 1938.
 Charles S. Peabody (1880-1935), American architect. Partner of Ludlow and Peabody.
 Dave Peabody (born 1948), English singer-songwriter, blues and folk musician, record producer and photographer
 Dwight Peabody (1894–1972), American football player
 Elizabeth Peabody (1804–1894), American educator
 Endicott Peabody (educator) (1857–1944), American Episcopal priest and founder of the Groton School for Boys
 Malcolm Endicott Peabody (1888–1974), reverend, son of Endicott Peabody
Mary E. Peabody (1891–1981), civil-rights and anti-war activist in the 1960s, married to Malcolm Endicott Peabody.
 Marietta Endicott Peabody (1917–1991) socialite and political reporter, daughter of Malcolm Endicott Peabody and Mary Elizabeth Peabody.
 Endicott Peabody (1920–1997), American politician, governor of Massachusetts (1963-1965), son of Malcolm Endicott Peabody and Mary Elizabeth Peabody.
 Francis Greenwood Peabody (1847–1936), American minister and Harvard professor
 Frank Elmer Peabody (1914–1958), American paleontologist
 F. H. Peabody (fl. 1870s), American former vice-president (1874-1877) and director (1870-1879) of the Atchison, Topeka and Santa Fe Railway company (1874-1877), the city of Peabody, Kansas is named in his honor
 Francis S. Peabody (1858–1922), American businessman, founder of Peabody Energy as Peabody Coal in 1883
 George Peabody (1795–1869), American entrepreneur, London-based banker and philanthropist who founded the Peabody Institute, Museums, and Trust
 George Foster Peabody (1852–1938), American Southern banker and philanthropist for whom the Peabody Award is named
 James Hamilton Peabody (1852–1917), American politician, twice governor of Colorado (1903-1905 & 1905)
 Joseph Peabody (1757-1844), American shipowner and merchant of Salem, Massachusetts
 Catherine Endicott Peabody (1837–1898), American art patron, wife of John Lowell Gardner II and daughter of Joseph Peabody
 Lucy Whitehead McGill Waterbury Peabody (1861–1949), American Baptist missionary
 Nathaniel Peabody (1741–1823), American physician, Continental Congressman, state representative, and senator for New Hampshire
 Nathaniel Peabody (Boston) (1774–1855), American Boston Brahmin, father of Elizabeth Palmer, Mary Tyler, Sophia Amelia
 Raymond A. Peabody (1883-1973), American politician
 Richard R. Peabody (1892-1936), American author of The Common Sense of Drinking, a major influence on Alcoholics Anonymous founder Bill Wilson
 Sophia Peabody Hawthorne (1809-1871), American painter and illustrator, wife of author Nathaniel Hawthorne

Fictional
 Amelia Peabody, Character in a series of Victorian mystery novels by Elizabeth Peters
 Helena Peabody, Character on The L Word TV series
 Jeremiah Peabody, character who makes green and purple pills in song
 Josiah Peabody, Character in the novel The Captain from Connecticut (1941) by C. S. Forester
 Mister Peabody, Character on "The Rocky and Bullwinkle Show," genius dog accompanied by "his boy" Sherman.
 Professor Peabody (Jocelyn Mabel Peabody), Female character in the Dan Dare comic series

See also
 Peabody (disambiguation)

References

English-language surnames